is a passenger railway station located in Tarumi-ku, Kobe, Hyōgo Prefecture, Japan, operated by the West Japan Railway Company (JR West).  This station is the closest on the line to the Akashi Kaikyō Bridge, which is directly above the station and is also in close proximity to Kyogo Prefectural Maiko Park.

Lines

Station layout
The station consists of one island platforms connected to the station building by a footbridge. The station has a Midori no Madoguchi staffed ticket office. Special Rapid Service trains typically bypass the station on the two northernmost tracks while local trains normally stop at the station on the two southernmost tracks.

Platforms

Adjacent stations

|-
!colspan=5|JR West

History
Maiko Station opened on 1 July 1896 as a temporary stop, and was promoted to a full station on 1 December 1906. With the privatization of the Japan National Railways (JNR) on  1 April 1987, the station came under the aegis of the West Japan Railway Company.

Station numbering was introduced in March 2018 with Maiko being assigned station number JR-A71.

Passenger statistics
In fiscal 2019, the station was used by an average of 18,856 passengers daily

Surrounding area
Maiko-kōen Station (Sanyo Electric Railway Main Line)
Hyogo Prefectural Maiko Park 
Akashi Kaikyō Bridge
Sun Yat-sen Memorial Hall 
Akashi Domain Maiko Battery, National Historic Site

See also
List of railway stations in Japan

References

External links

 JR West Station Official Site

Sanyō Main Line
Railway stations in Kobe
Railway stations in Japan opened in 1896